Incredible Science Fiction was an American science fiction anthology comic published by EC Comics in 1955 and 1956, lasting a total of four issues.

Creative team 
Incredible Science Fiction ran for four issues, boasting a number of skilled artists including Jack Davis, Wally Wood, Bernard Krigstein, Joe Orlando and Roy Krenkel. Three of its covers were done by Davis, with the final issue's cover by Wood. This comic is notable for having Jack Davis' only science fiction work for EC. Roy Krenkel also provided his only solo story for EC with issue 31's "Time to Leave".

The story "Food For Thought" from issue 32 (which featured art predominantly from Al Williamson but also Roy Krenkel as well) was awarded best artwork for an individual science fiction story at the 1972 EC Fan-Addict Convention.

History

Origin 
Incredible Science Fiction was a retitled version of the comic Weird Science-Fantasy, which changed its title in 1955.  The comic changed its title with issue 30, but due to attempts to save money on postage, the numbering did not restart (and hence, issue 30 is actually the first issue of this title).

Comics Code
Aside from the title change, Incredible Science Fiction was also different from its predecessor because it now had to follow the tight standards of the Comics Code, which was created in 1954 to censor the controversial comics of that time. Eventually the Comics Code would spell the end of not only this comic, but all comics produced by EC. When a story in issue 33 did not meet the standards of the Code, publisher Bill Gaines and editor Al Feldstein decided to reprint the story "Judgment Day!" (originally in Weird Fantasy #18). A powerful anti-racism story, "Judgment Day!" was also rejected because Judge Charles Murphy, the Comics Code Administrator, demanded that an illustration of a black astronaut be altered. Gaines refused and threatened to take the matter to the Supreme Court. The Comics Code backed down, and Gaines then printed the story without any changes.  But Gaines had seen the writing on the wall, and he left the comic book industry soon after.  Incredible Science Fiction #33 was the last comic book he would publish.

Reprints 
Incredible Science Fiction has been reprinted by EC-fan and publisher Russ Cochran on a couple of occasions. It formed part of his Complete EC Library (in 1982), published (in black and white) as a slipcased hardcover two-volume set alongside Weird Science-Fantasy. It was also reprinted issue-by-issue between August 1994 and May 1995 by Cochran (in association with Gemstone Publishing).  This complete run was later rebound, again alongside Weird Science-Fantasy, with covers included, in a pair of softcover EC Annuals.

Resurfacing 
The title resurfaced in a 1974 fantasy story, "Present Perfect", by Thomas F. Monteleone. The story focuses on William Rutherford, who is the editor of a speculative fiction magazine titled Incredible Science Fiction. After rejecting one story after another, he picks up a manuscript which is Monteleone's "Present Perfect". This tale was published in Fantastic (September 1974). Such recursive plotting was employed several times by EC, including "The Aliens", illustrated by Al Williamson for Weird Fantasy #17 (January–February 1953).

Issues

References

External links
"The Worlds of Science Fiction Comics" by Steve Stiles
The Weird Fantasy Homepage

EC Comics publications
Science fiction comics
Comics anthologies